Yousuf Othman Qader (born April 5, 1985) is a Qatari marathon runner. Qader represented Qatar at the 2008 Summer Olympics in Beijing, where he competed for the men's marathon, along with his compatriot Mubarak Shami. He finished the race in sixty-fourth place by fourteen seconds behind Guatemala's Alfredo Arévalo, with a time of 2:28:40.

Qader also achieved his personal best time of 2:13:18 at the 2007 Hamburg Marathon.

References

External links

NBC 2008 Olympics profile

Qatari male marathon runners
Living people
Olympic athletes of Qatar
Athletes (track and field) at the 2008 Summer Olympics
1985 births